The Guantanamo collared sphaero (Sphaerodactylus schwartzi), also known commonly as the Monitongas collared geckolet and Schwartz's dwarf gecko, is a species of lizard in the family Sphaerodactylidae. The species is endemic to Cuba.

Etymology
The specific name, schwartzi, is in honor of American herpetologist Albert Schwartz.

Habitat

Description
Adults of S. schwartzi have a snout-to-vent length (SVL) of only .

Reproduction
S. schwartzi is oviparous.

References

Further reading
Rösler H (2000). "Kommentierte Liste der rezent, subrezent und fossil bekannten Geckotaxa (Reptilia: Gekkonomorpha)". Gekkota 2: 28–153. (Sphaerodactylus schwartzi, p. 114). (in German).
Thomas R, Hedges SB, Garrido OH (1992). "Two New Species of Sphaerodactylus from Eastern Cuba (Squamata: Gekkonidae)". Herpetologica 48 (3): 358–367. (Sphaerodactylus schwartzi, new species, pp. 359–362, Figures 1A, 2).

Sphaerodactylus
Endemic fauna of Cuba
Reptiles of Cuba
Reptiles described in 1992